Radharaman Institute of Technology and Science or Radha Raman Institute of Technology and Science or RITS is an engineering institute located in Bhopal, Madhya Pradesh. It is approved by AICTE and affiliated with Rajiv Gandhi Proudyogiki Vishwavidyalaya, Bhopal, India.

History 
Radharaman Institute of Technology and Science (RITS) was established by Typasya Education Society in 2003. It is the pioneer institute of the Radharaman Group of Institutes, which is situated in Ratibad, on the outskirts of Bhopal.

See also 
 List of educational institutions in Bhopal
 List of Engineering Colleges in Madhya Pradesh

References

External links 
 

Private engineering colleges in India
Engineering colleges in Madhya Pradesh
Universities and colleges in Bhopal
Educational institutions established in 2003
2003 establishments in Madhya Pradesh